P14 is a regional road (P-Highway) in Volyn Oblast, Ukraine. It runs north-south and connects Lutsk with the Belarus-Ukraine border.

Main route
Main route and connections to/intersections with other highways in Ukraine.

See also

 Roads in Ukraine

References

External links
Regional Roads in Ukraine in Russian

Roads in Volyn Oblast